American Hunger is a triple album released on CD. It was released in 2006 by Manhattan, New York rap artist MF Grimm. It is also the first triple album in hip-hop history. It was originally planned for release on July 4, 2004, however multiple delays occurred including having to remove MF Doom's productions from the tracks and MF Grimm's hard drive losing data.

MF Grimm has stated that the album is not intended to be listened to in one sitting, rather it is intended to be taken in over the course of three separate listening sessions, reflecting the names of each disc: "Breakfast," "Lunch" and "Dinner."

Reception

American Hunger has received very positive reviews from music critics and fans. Marisa Brown, writing for Allmusic, gave the album four stars out of five and called the album "a hard-hitting, provocative record that contains none of the skits or other filler commonly associated with hip-hop." Brown continued by concluding that the album is "one of the most thought-provoking and intelligent records -- in any genre -- of the new century." A.J. Henriques, writing for Stylus Magazine, gave the album an "A" score and said:

Fan reception over the years has been positive, and American Hunger has remained one of MF Grimm's most popular and enduring albums.

Track listing

Credits adapted from American Hunger liner notes.
All tracks written by MF Grimm unless otherwise noted.

References

External links
 Official site of Percy Carey aka MF Grimm
 Official blog of Percy Carey aka MF Grimm
 American Hunger digi-mag
 Day By Day Entertainment, Grimm's record label

2006 albums
MF Grimm albums